Ravichandran is an Indian film director, who has directed Tamil films. After making his debut in 1998 with the successful  Kannedhirey Thondrinal, he has gone on to make other ventures including Sandhitha Velai and Majunu.

Career 
Ravichandran made his debut by directing Kannedhirey Thondrinal (1998), a love story featuring Prashanth and Simran, and the film gained positive reviews from critics and went on to become a commercial success. His next Sandhitha Velai fared less well, while his third venture Majunu saw him collaborate with Prashanth again. Through the film, he also introduced music director Harris Jayaraj to work on his first film soundtrack, though other projects eventually released earlier.

His most recent release was Urchagam, a thriller starring Nandha and Sherin, which opened to average reviews in 2007. In 2014, he announced that he is working on a movie featuring his nephew Raj Bharath and Amzhath in lead roles.

Filmography

References 

Living people
Tamil film directors
Film directors from Tamil Nadu
1971 births
20th-century Indian film directors
21st-century Indian film directors